Kristine Saastad (born 31 August 1987) is a Norwegian former professional racing cyclist. She won the Norwegian National Road Race Championship in 2007.

References

External links
 

1987 births
Living people
Norwegian female cyclists
People from Kongsberg
Sportspeople from Viken (county)